Live at Hampton Coliseum is an album by the rock band the Grateful Dead.  It was recorded on May 4, 1979, at the Hampton Coliseum in Hampton, Virginia.  Produced as a two-disc vinyl LP, in a limited edition of 7,900 numbered copies, it was released on April 19, 2014, in conjunction with Record Store Day.

The May 4, 1979 concert was the band's first show at Hampton Coliseum, and their third with then-new keyboardist Brent Mydland.

Track listing
Side one
"Loser" (Jerry Garcia, Robert Hunter) – 7:39
"New Minglewood Blues" (traditional, arranged by Grateful Dead) – 5:14
"Don't Ease Me In" (traditional, arranged by Grateful Dead) – 3:20
"Passenger" (Phil Lesh, Peter Monk) – 5:36
Side two
"I Need a Miracle" (Bob Weir, John Barlow) – 4:26
"Bertha" (Garcia, Hunter) – 6:26
"Good Lovin'" (Rudy Clark, Arthur Resnick) – 6:51
"Ship of Fools" (Garcia, Hunter) – 7:36
Side three
"Estimated Prophet" (Weir, Barlow) – 12:24
"Eyes of the World" (Garcia, Hunter) – 13:21
Side four
"Truckin'" (Garcia, Lesh, Weir, Hunter) – 8:14
"Stella Blue" (Garcia, Hunter) – 10:39
"Around and Around" (Chuck Berry) – 7:20

Personnel
Grateful Dead
Jerry Garcia – guitar, vocals
Mickey Hart –  drums
Bill Kreutzmann – drums
Phil Lesh – bass
Brent Mydland – keyboards, vocals
Bob Weir – guitar, vocals
Production
Produced by Grateful Dead
Produced for release by David Lemieux
Executive producer: Mark Pinkus
Associate producers: Doran Tyson, Ryan Wilson
LP mastering: Jeffrey Norman
Lacquers cut by: Chris Bellman
Recording: Dan Healy
Illustrations: Kyle Field
Photography: James R. Anderson
Art direction, design: Jonathan Lane

Concert set list
The complete set list for the May 4, 1979 concert at Hampton Coliseum was:

First set: "Mississippi Half-Step Uptown Toodeloo" > "Franklin's Tower", "Mama Tried" > "Mexicali Blues", "Candyman", "Lazy Lightning" > "Supplication", "Loser"*, "New Minglewood Blues"*, "Don't Ease Me In"*, "Passenger"*
Second set: "I Need a Miracle"* > "Bertha"* > "Good Lovin'"*, "Ship of Fools"*, "Estimated Prophet"* > "Eyes Of The World"* > "Drums" > "Space" > "Truckin'"* > "Stella Blue"* > "Around and Around"*

* Included in Live at Hampton Coliseum

References

Grateful Dead live albums
Record Store Day releases
Rhino Entertainment live albums
2014 live albums